Bells may refer to:

 Bell, a musical instrument

Places
 Bells, North Carolina
 Bells, Tennessee
 Bells, Texas
 Bells Beach, Victoria, an internationally famous surf beach in Australia
 Bells Corners, Ontario

Music
 Bells, directly struck percussion instruments
 Glockenspiel, also known as bells
 The Bells (band), a Canadian rock band from the 1970s
 Bells (album), an album by Albert Ayler
 The Bells (Lou Reed album), an album by Lou Reed
 The Bells (symphony), or in Russian "Kolokola," a choral work by Rachmaninov based on the poem by Edgar Allan Poe
"Bells", a song by Fred Wesley and Horny Horns from the album The Final Blow

Film and television
 "Bells" (Blackadder), an episode of the British sitcom Blackadder II
 "Bells", an episode of New Girl
 Bells, a 1982 Canadian-American film also known as Murder by Phone

Brands and enterprises
 Bell's Brewery, a brewery in Michigan, United States
 Bell's whisky, a blended whisky
 Bells Stores, a defunct convenience store chain formerly operating in North East England

Other uses
 "Bells", nickname of former professional basketball player Joe Colone
 "The Bells" (poem), a poem by Edgar Allan Poe
 The Bells (Old Kingdom Series), sets of magical bells important in Garth Nix's fantasy series
 Bell's theorem, in physics, created by Irish physicist John Stewart Bell
 Bellingham Bells, a team in the West Coast Collegiate Baseball League
 Ship's bells, used for timekeeping
 The Bells of 1961, a meteorite which fell in Texas, United States (see Meteorite fall)

See also
 Bel (disambiguation)
 Belis (disambiguation)
 Bell (disambiguation)
 Bell (surname)
 Bell House (disambiguation)
 Belle (disambiguation)
 Paul Revere 
 The Bell (disambiguation)
 The Bells (disambiguation)